Henry Augustus Ward (March 9, 1834 – July 4, 1906) was an American naturalist and geologist.

Biography
Henry Augustus Ward was born in Rochester, New York on March 9, 1834. After attending Williams College and the Lawrence Scientific School, Harvard, where he was an assistant of Louis Agassiz, he traveled in Egypt, Arabia, and Palestine, and studied at the Jardin des Plantes, the Sorbonne, and the School of Mines in Paris, and at the universities of Munich and Freiberg. Subsequently, he traveled in West Africa and the West Indies, making natural history collections.

In 1860, he returned to Rochester where he was professor at the University of Rochester until 1865. In Rochester, he founded Ward's Natural Science, a pioneer enterprise of its kind, which collected specimens from all parts of the world, and then mounted and sold them to colleges and museums.

He published:
 Notices of the Megatherium Cuvieri (1863)
 Descriptions of the Most Celebrated Fossil Animals in the Royal Museums of Europe (1866)
 
In 1897, he married a widow, Lydia Avery Coonley, (1845–1924), president of the Chicago Woman's Club in 1895-96, who wrote Under the Pines, and other Verses (1895); Singing Verses for Children (1897); Love Songs (1898).

He died on July 4, 1906, after being struck by an automobile in Buffalo, New York, becoming Buffalo's first automobile related fatality. His ashes were interred in Mount Hope Cemetery in a niche in his granite monument. Subsequently the ashes were stolen. His monument is surmounted by a glacial erratic boulder which shows jasper inclusions. He found the boulder north of Georgian Bay, Ontario, Canada. Ward's brain was contributed to the Wilder Brain Collection at Cornell University.

References

External links

Ward's Natural Science
Ward's Natural Science History
Henry A. Ward by Robert G. Koch
 
The Ward Project at the University of Rochester

1834 births
1906 deaths
Burials at Mount Hope Cemetery (Rochester)
Williams College alumni
Harvard School of Engineering and Applied Sciences alumni
University of Paris alumni
University of Rochester faculty
American naturalists
Road incident deaths in New York (state)
Scientists from Rochester, New York
Pedestrian road incident deaths
American expatriates in France